Lili Qiu  is a Chinese computer scientist known for her research on wireless networks. She is a professor of computer science at the University of Texas at Austin.

Education and career
Qiu was born in Shanghai, where she attended Nanyang Model High School.
She moved to the US for her undergraduate studies, earning a bachelor's degree with honors for a double major in computer science and physics at the University of Bridgeport.

She completed her Ph.D. at Cornell University. Her dissertation, An Integrated Approach to Improving Web Performance, was jointly supervised by Robbert van Renesse and George Varghese.

After working at Microsoft Research, Redmond, WA from 2001 to 2004, she joined the Department of Computer Science at University of Texas at Austin as an Assistant Professor in 2005, and later promoted to a tenured Professor.

Recognition
Qiu became a fellow of the Institute of Electrical and Electronics Engineers in 2017 , elected as an ACM Fellow in 2018 for "contributions to the design and analysis of wireless network protocols and mobile systems" , and selected as a Fellow of National Academy of Inventors in 2022 .  She was also recognized as N2Women: Stars in Computer Networking and Communications in 2017, ACM Distinguished Scientist in 2013, and NSF CAREER Award in 2006. She got best paper awards at ACM MobiSys'18 and IEEE ICNP'17.

References

External links

Living people
American computer scientists
Chinese computer scientists
American women computer scientists
University of Bridgeport alumni
Cornell University alumni
University of Texas at Austin faculty
Fellows of the Association for Computing Machinery
Fellow Members of the IEEE
Scientists from Shanghai
Microsoft Research people
Year of birth missing (living people)
American women academics
21st-century American women
Nanyang Model High School alumni
21st-century American academics